John Benedict Eden, Baron Eden of Winton,  (15 September 1925 – 23 May 2020), known as Sir John Eden, 9th Baronet, from 1963 to 1983, was a British Conservative Party politician who served as Member of Parliament for Bournemouth West from 1954 to 1983.

Background
Eden was the son of Sir Timothy Calvert Eden and Edith Mary Prendergast. 
He was educated at Eton College and St Paul's School, New Hampshire, in the US. He served as a Lieutenant with the Rifle Brigade, 2nd Gurkha Rifles and the Gilgit Scouts during the Second World War. He was a nephew of Sir Anthony Eden (1897–1977), who served as prime minister from 1955 to 1957, and he succeeded his father Sir Timothy Calvert Eden to his baronetcies in 1963. He was the 9th Baronet of West Auckland and the 7th Baronet of Maryland.

Career
After an unsuccessful attempt to contest the 1953 Paddington North by-election, Eden was first elected as a Conservative Member of Parliament (MP) for Bournemouth West at the 1954 Bournemouth West by-election, which he would continue to represent from 1954 until 1983. When first elected, he was the Baby of the House, the youngest member of the House of Commons. He was appointed to the Privy Council on 10 April 1972 and was created a life peer as Baron Eden of Winton, of Rushyford in the County of Durham on 3 October 1983, following his retirement from the House of Commons. He retired from the House of Lords on 11 June 2015 under the provisions of the House of Lords Reform Act 2014. Following the death of Lord Healey on 3 October 2015, Eden became the oldest surviving former MP with the earliest date of first election.

Appointments: 
 Member of the House of Commons Estimates committee (1960–1964)
 Delegate to Council of Europe and West European Union (1960–1962)
 Delegate to NATO Technology (June–October 1970)
 Minister of State for Industry (1970–1972)
 Minister of Posts and Telecommunications (1972–1974)
 Member of the House of Commons Expenditure committee (1974–1976)
 Chairman of the Select Committee on EEC Legislation (1976–1979)
 Chairman of the Select Committee on Home Affairs (1980–1983)
 Chairman of the British Lebanese Association (1990–1998)
 Chairman of the Royal Armouries Association (1986–1994)
 Member of Timken Company International Advisory Board
 Chairman of Lady Eden's Schools Ltd

Family life
He was twice married:
 1) Belinda Jane Pascoe (1954 – divorced 1974); four children
 The Honourable Emily Rose Eden (born 1959)
 The Honourable Arabella Charlotte Eden (born 1960)
 The Honourable Sir Robert Frederick Calvert Eden (born 30 April 1964). The 10th Baronet of West Auckland and 8th Baronet of Maryland. 
 The Honourable John "Jack" Edward Morton Eden (born 1966). Heir presumptive to the baronetcies. 
 2) Margaret Ann Gordon (1977 – his death 2020). A former wife of the Earl of Perth.

Arms

References

External links
 

1925 births
2020 deaths
Baronets in the Baronetage of England
Baronets in the Baronetage of Great Britain
Conservative Party (UK) MPs for English constituencies
Conservative Party (UK) life peers
Rifle Brigade officers
Royal Gurkha Rifles officers
Members of the Privy Council of the United Kingdom
People educated at Eton College
UK MPs 1951–1955
UK MPs 1955–1959
UK MPs 1959–1964
UK MPs 1964–1966
UK MPs 1966–1970
UK MPs 1970–1974
UK MPs 1974
UK MPs 1974–1979
UK MPs 1979–1983
John Eden
Indian Army personnel of World War II
British Army personnel of World War II
Life peers created by Elizabeth II